Marilyn McMeen Miller Brown (born 1938) is an American novelist best known for her work within her native Mormon culture. She is the creator and namesake of the Marilyn Brown Novel Award.

Brown has written 14 novels.  In 2000, she served as president of the Association for Mormon Letters. Brown has also had works attributed to her not only as Marilyn Brown, but as Marilyn Miller, Marilyn McMeen Miller, Marilyn R. Brown and several other related variants.

Biography
Marilyn was born in Denver, Colorado. She holds two degrees from Brigham Young University and another from the University of Utah. Her first marriage was with the jazz musician Lloyd Miller. In 1975 she married Bill Brown and they are the parents of six children.

Brown has taught English at Brigham Young University and served as an editor for the Brigham Young University Press.

Brown is also a Latter-day Saint hymnwriter. She wrote the words to the hymn "Thy Servants Are Prepared" which is included in the 1985 LDS Church English-language hymnal.

Brown has also written a large amount of poetry.  She has been included in a listing of 75 significant Mormon poets.

Brown's first novel Earth Keepers was published in 1979.  Her novel Serpent in Paradise, based on Richard Dutcher's 2001 film "Brigham City" was published in 2006. Her novel The Wine Dark Sea of Grass is her fictional take on the Mountain Meadows massacre.

References

External links
Marilyn Brown papers, MSS 3285 at L. Tom Perry Special Collections, Brigham Young University

1938 births
20th-century American novelists
20th-century American poets
20th-century American women writers
21st-century American novelists
21st-century American poets
21st-century American women writers
American Latter Day Saint hymnwriters
American Latter Day Saint writers
American women novelists
American women poets
Brigham Young University alumni
Brigham Young University faculty
Latter Day Saint poets
Living people
University of Utah alumni
Writers from Denver
Novelists from Utah
American women hymnwriters
Novelists from Colorado
Latter Day Saints from Colorado
Latter Day Saints from Utah
American women non-fiction writers
21st-century American non-fiction writers